Carolina is a bairro in the District of Sede in the municipality of Santa Maria, in the Brazilian state of Rio Grande do Sul. It is located in north Santa Maria.

Villages 
The bairro contains the following villages: Carolina, Vila Carolina and Vila Valdemar Rodrigues.

References 

Bairros of Santa Maria, Rio Grande do Sul